Anil Adhikari (c. 1949 – 31 October 2019) was an Indian politician belonging to All India Trinamool Congress. He was elected as a member of the West Bengal Legislative Assembly from Falakata in 2011 and 2016. He died of cancer on 31 October 2019 at the age of 70.

References

1940s births
2019 deaths
Trinamool Congress politicians from West Bengal
West Bengal MLAs 2011–2016
West Bengal MLAs 2016–2021